Coláiste Bríde, Enniscorthy is an girls Voluntary Catholic Secondary School located in Co. Wexford. Coláiste Bríde was founded by the Sisters of Mercy and operates under the Trusteeship of CEIST.

History
Coláiste Bríde was founded by the Sisters of Mercy who arrived in Enniscorthy in 1859 to open a convent to meet the needs of the poor. In 1860 two rooms were procured and classes for children and adults commenced. Recognising the necessity for training the young, in 1882 the nuns opened a workroom where they taught knitting, shirt making and associated crafts.

In 1935, the sisters built Secondary Top, a building to house the second level pupils, under the direction of Sr. Catherine Bolger. In 1970, the Secondary Top was upgraded to full secondary status with the opening of phase one of the present Coláiste Bríde. The second phase was opened in 1978.
5.  

In 2007, the school began operating under the trusteeship of Catholic Education an Irish Schools Trust (CEIST).

Facilities
The facilities include a canteen, sports hall, library, science labs, home economics kitchens, IT labs, art rooms, music room, a well-being area and football pitch.

Extracurricular activities
 Sports: Athletics, basketball, camogie, equestrian, golf, girls football, soccer
 Clubs: Book club, debating, junior choir

Events
 Every year the school holds a positive mental health week, "I am Worth it"
 Every year there is a Christmas Carol Service and Christmas Quiz with acting, dancing, and group performances by the teachers.
 The school has regular events to promote literacy as part of the Well Read Initiative

References

 Enniscorthy
Secondary schools in County Wexford